Madball is an American New York hardcore band formed in New York City, that originated in the late 1980s as a side project of Agnostic Front. The band developed after Agnostic Front's front man Roger Miret would let his younger half-brother Freddy Cricien take the microphone and perform lead vocals during Agnostic Front shows.

History 
Madball was founded in 1988 and featured most of Agnostic Front's members. Madball consisted of Agnostic Front's vocalist Roger Miret on bass, Vinnie Stigma on guitar, Will Shepler on drums, and then 12-year-old vocalist Freddy Cricien, Roger Miret's younger half-brother. Madball's first few performances consisted of previously unused Agnostic Front songs. Madball's first release was the Ball of Destruction EP in 1989. After years of playing regional shows in and around the New York area, a second guitarist, Matt Henderson, joined the band. By then, they recorded and released the EP, Droppin' Many Suckers, for Wreck-Age Records. One year later, Roger Miret left the band and was replaced by bass player Jorge "Hoya Roc" Guerra — a good friend of Freddy Cricien — who was looking for a new band as his band, Dmize, was breaking up. The new incarnation of the band was signed by Roadrunner Records in 1994 and released a pair of full-lengths; Set It Off in 1994 and Demonstrating My Style in 1996. Touring steadily, the band built a sizable fan base outside their hometown.

1995 saw the band participating in the N.Y.H.C. documentary. Extensive interviews were conducted with Freddy as well as a performance on July 29, 1995 at the now-defunct "Coney Island High". Freddy's brother, Roger, broke several vertebrae in his back at that show, requiring him to be in traction for the better part of a year.

Consisting of Cricien, Henderson, Guerra, and new drummer John Lafata (former drummer in Neglect), the band recorded Look My Way, which was released in early 1998. Hold It Down followed two years later. The band announced their dissolution in 2001 but decided to reform in late 2002 with a new line-up featuring Brian "Mitts" Daniels and Rigg Ross. They began touring and recording at the end of 2002. Since then, Madball has come out with: Best of Madball in 2003, N.Y.H.C. EP (EP) in 2004, Legacy in 2005, and Infiltrate The System in 2007. In 2009, Rigg Ross left to join Skarhead and was replaced by Ben Dussault.

Along with bands such as Agnostic Front, Vietnom, Bulldoze, Resistance, H2O and Boston/New York Hip-hop group Special Teamz (Slaine, Ed O.G., Jaysaun, DJ Jayceeoh), they comprise a part of New York's DMS Crew. Vocalist Cricien and bass player Hoya are also in the band Hazen Street, along with members of H2O and Cro-Mags.

In 2010, after the departure of the Ferret Records owners from the label, Madball followed them to their new and present label Good Fight Music. In February 2010 Madball signed a deal with Nuclear Blast for the European release of their new studio album, Empire, produced by Erik Rutan.  Jay Weinberg, son of E Street Band and Max Weinberg 7 drummer Max Weinberg, joined Madball for the album and for touring.

Madball then dismissed Weinberg in September 2010, citing personality conflicts. Weinberg said that he had already quit the group by that time, due to lifestyle issues. Born From Pain drummer Igor Wouters replaced Weinberg for live performances.

On March 10, 2014, it was announced the band had begun recording its eighth studio album, Hardcore Lives, which was released in June of that year.

In October 2017, it was announced that Brian "Mitts" Daniels had exited Madball.

Madball released their ninth studio album, For the Cause, on June 15, 2018.

In January 2019, Madball announced that their touring guitarist, Mike Gurnari, would become an official member.

Band members

Current members
 Freddy Cricien – lead vocals 
 Jorge "Hoya Roc" Guerra – bass, backing vocals 
 Mike Justian – drums, backing vocals 
 Mike Gurnari – guitars 

Live musicians
 Walter Ryan – drums 
 Mackie Jayson – drums 
 Ben Dussault – drums 
 Igor Wouters – drums 
 Dominik Stammen – guitars 

Former members
 Roger Miret – bass 
 Vinnie Stigma – guitars 
 Will Shepler – drums 
 Matt Henderson – guitars 
 Rob Rosario – guitars 
 Darren Morgenthaler – drums 
 John Lafata – drums 
 Rigg Ross – drums 
 Jay Weinberg – drums 
 Brian "Mitts" Daniels – guitars 

Timeline

Discography 
Studio albums
Set It Off (1994)
Demonstrating My Style (1996)
Look My Way (1998)
Hold It Down (2000)
Legacy (2005)
Infiltrate the System (2007)
Empire (2010)
Hardcore Lives (2014)
For the Cause (2018)

EPs
Ball of Destruction (1989)
Droppin' Many Suckers (1992)
N.Y.H.C. EP (2004)
Rebellion (2012)

 Compilations
The Best of Madball (2003)

References

External links

 Official website
 Madball on Myspace
 [ Madball] at AllMusic

Epitaph Records artists
Hardcore punk groups from New York (state)
Musical groups established in 1988
Musical quartets
Nuclear Blast artists
Ferret Music artists
1988 establishments in New York City